Odontocorynus salebrosus is a species of weevils in the family Curculionidae. It occurs in Canada and U.S.A.

References 

Baridinae
Beetles described in 1892